The 2021 Florida Atlantic Owls football team represented Florida Atlantic University in the 2021 NCAA Division I FBS football season. The Owls played their home games at FAU Stadium in Boca Raton, Florida, and competed in the East Division of Conference USA (CUSA). They were led by head coach Willie Taggart, in his second year.

Schedule

References

Florida Atlantic
Florida Atlantic Owls football seasons
Florida Atlantic Owls football